"Blue" is a song by English rock band the Verve. It was released as the first single from their first album, A Storm in Heaven, which was released through Hut Records. The song peaked at number 69 on the UK Singles Chart. The video shows the band down a dark alleyway in Islington, London. There was a separate video for the US, which was filmed in Dublin.

Track listing
 CD (HUTCD 29) 
 "Blue"
 "Twilight"
 "Where the Geese Go"
 "No Come Down"

References

External links
 Music video

The Verve songs
1993 singles
1993 songs
Hut Records singles
Song recordings produced by John Leckie
Songs written by Nick McCabe
Songs written by Peter Salisbury
Songs written by Richard Ashcroft
Songs written by Simon Jones (musician)